The women's doubles sprint competition at the 2023 FIL World Luge Championships was held on 27 January 2023.

Results
The qualification was held at 09:00 and the final at 13:34.

References

Women's doubles' sprint